Below is the list of notable international treaties signed by the government of Turkey (Between 23 April 1920 and 29 October 1923 as the government of Turkish parliament and after 29 October 1923 as the government of Republic of Turkey) 

Pre-republican era: 

Republican era:

treaties
List
Turkey